Language disorders or language impairments are disorders that involve the processing of linguistic information.  Problems that may be experienced can involve grammar (syntax and/or morphology),  semantics (meaning), or other aspects of language.  These problems may be receptive (involving impaired language comprehension), expressive (involving language production), or a combination of both.  Examples include specific language impairment, better defined as developmental language disorder, or DLD, and aphasia, among others.  Language disorders can affect both spoken and written language, and can also affect sign language; typically, all forms of language will be impaired.

Current data indicates that 7% of young children display language disorder, with boys being diagnosed twice as often as girls.

Preliminary research on potential risk factors have suggested biological components, such as low birth weight, prematurity, general birth complications, and male gender, as well as family history and low parental education can increase the chance of developing language disorders.

For children with phonological and expressive language difficulties, there is evidence supporting speech and language therapy. However, the same therapy is shown to be much less effective for receptive language difficulties. These results are consistent with the poorer prognosis for receptive language impairments that are generally accompanied with problems in reading comprehension.

Note that these are distinct from speech disorders, which involve difficulty with the act of speech production, but not with language.

Language disorders tend to manifest in two different ways: receptive language disorders (where one cannot properly comprehend language) and expressive language disorders (where one cannot properly communicate their intended message).

Receptive language disorders 
Receptive language disorders can be acquired—as in the case of receptive aphasia, or developmental (most often the latter). When developmental, difficulties in spoken language tend to occur before three years of age. Usually such disorders are accompanied by expressive language disorders.

However, unique symptoms and signs of a receptive language disorder include: struggling to understand meanings of words and sentences, struggling to put words in proper order, and inability to follow verbal instruction.

Treatment options include: language therapy, special education classes for children at school, and a psychologist if accompanying behavioral problems are present.

Expressive language disorders 
Expressive aphasia is characterized by partial loss of the ability to produce language, although comprehension generally remains intact; it is typically a result of stroke, trauma, or tumors. Other expressive language disorders may impair not only voice and articulation, but also the mental formation of language, itself.

Expressive language disorders can occur during a child's development or they can be acquired. This acquisition usually follows a normal neurological development and is brought about by a number of causes such as head trauma or irradiation.

Features of an expressive language disorder vary, but have certain features in common such as: limited vocabulary, inability to produce complex grammar, and more lexical errors.

If it is a developmental disorder, the child will have difficulty acquiring new words and grammatical structures. The child will often begin speaking later than his/her peers and progress at a slower rate linguistically. Due to the very nature of these disorders, the child may struggle with academics and socializing with peers.

Experts that commonly treat such disorders include speech pathologists and audiologists.

Psychopathology of language 
A special class of language disorders is studied by the psychopathology of language. Its topics of interest range from simple speech error to dream speech and schizophasia.

Childhood language disorders 
During childhood the most common type of disruption in communication is a language disorder. In most cases, language development is predicable and referrals for evaluation may be needed in cases where a child's language development is atypical. Language disorders among children are present when a child is experiencing substantial difficulty regarding their language development. Among young children, language disorders have been associated with higher rates of social difficulties and anxiety.

Specific language impairment 
Specific language impairment (SLI) is a developmental language disorder among children that has no known cause and cannot be attributed to any physical or intellectual disability, environmental factors such as deprivation, hearing loss, or any other underlying etiology. SLI is characterized by abnormal development of language that includes a delay in the onset of language, simplification of grammatical structures and difficulty with grammatical morphology, limited vocabulary, and problems understanding complex language. Children with SLI tend to begin speaking at a later age and have a smaller vocabulary than their peers. Among the language disorders that are present during childhood, SLI is one of the most prevalent, affecting roughly 7% of children. While children with specific language impairment have difficulty with language production, they are noted to have normal levels of intelligence.

Autism spectrum disorder 
Autism spectrum disorder (ASD) is a term used to define a group of developmental disorders that are characterized by disruption in communication and social abilities, limited eye contact, exhibiting repetitive behaviors, and having limited interests. Due to the impact that autism has on communication and social interactions, language is affected in most instances.

Acquired neurogenic language disorders 
Language disorders that are neurogenic affect the nervous system and result in disruption in language production. The type of language dysfunction that occurs is dependent upon the site, extent, and cause of the brain damage.

Aphasia 
Aphasia is a language disorder that is caused by damage to the tissue in the language center in the brain. The type of incident that most often causes Aphasia is stroke but can also occur due to traumatic brain injury, infection, tumors, and degenerative brain disorders. Aphasia is a disorder that is acquired, therefore it occurs in individuals that have already developed language. Aphasia does not affect a person's intellect or speech but Instead affects the formulation of language. All areas of language are affected by aphasia including expressive and receptive language abilities. Symptoms of aphasia vary widely but generally are defined by language deficits that affect fluency, the ability to talk, reading, writing, and comprehension. There are many types of aphasia that vary in symptoms depending upon where in the language center of the brain the damage occurred. The aphasias can be categorized as different aphasic syndromes depending upon the location of lesion and the symptoms that differentiate the aphasias from one another. Global aphasia is a type of aphasia that occurs in people where a large portion of the language center of the brain has been damaged and results in deficits in all modalities of language. Broca's aphasia, also referred to as expressive aphasia, is an aphasic syndrome in which there is damage in left hemisphere, specifically in the Broca's area, of the brain. Broca's aphasia may affect an individual's ability to produce speech while comprehension remains intact.

Traumatic brain injury 
Traumatic brain injury (TBI) is caused by neurological damage due to an open or closed head injury. The most frequent causes of head injury include motor vehicle accidents, assault, gun related incidents, and falls, TBI is categorized as either mild, moderate or severe and can affect cognitive, psychosocial, and linguistic skills. Language skills that may be affected include comprehension, motor output, word finding, and difficulties with reading.

Classification 
In order to help distinguish between language disorders, they are often categorized as either primary disorders of language, secondary disorders of langue, acquired or developmental. A primary language disorder is one that cannot be attributed to an underlying disorder and is solely responsible for the language disturbance while a secondary language disorder is the result of another disorder. Language disorders can also be categorized as developmental or acquired. A developmental language disorder is present at birth while an acquired language disorder occurs at some point after birth. Acquired language disorders can often be attributed to injuries within the brain due to occurrences such as stroke or Traumatic brain injury.

See also 

 Aphasia
 Auditory processing disorder
 Broca's area
 Communication disorder
 Dyslexia
 Expressive aphasia
 List of language disorders
 Receptive aphasia
 Semantic pragmatic disorder
 Specific language impairment
 Speech repetition

References

Further reading

External links 

 
Communication disorders
Neurological disorders
Speech and language pathology